The KORKUT is a Turkish all-weather-capable 35 mm self-propelled anti-aircraft gun (SPAAG) developed by Aselsan.

Designed to replace to aging M42A1 Duster systems of the Turkish Armed Forces, each Korkut system compromises of 1 command and control vehicle and 3 weapons platforms. Each weapon platform carries a twin 2×35 mm Oerlikon KDC-02 cannon, manufactured under licence by MKEK. Each weapons system can fire up to 1100 rounds a minute up to a range of 4 km. The command and control vehicle has an effective radar range of 70 km.  The Weapon System Vehicle and Command-and-Control Vehicle configurations designed under the Korkut Project are based on the FNSS ACV-30 and is fully amphibious and have the capability of propelling themselves in deep water and rivers.

The Turkish Armed Forces has ordered 40 weapons systems, deliveries are scheduled to complete in 2022.

Ammunition
The cannons can fire different types of 35×228 mm ammunitions including Aselsan made ATOM 35mm airburst ammunition.

ATOM 35mm airburst ammunition ejects tungsten pellets at a predetermined distance. It is a smart ammunition which has a base fuse. Together with the ability of precise time counting and the capability of being programmed during firing by taking muzzle velocity into consideration automatically sets the fuse to detonate the round as it approaches a pre-set distance from the target.  Whilst a single pellet is too small to do major damage in itself, the accumulation of damage from multiple strikes is designed to destroy wings and control surfaces, sensors and aerodynamics, causing the target to crash. According to Aselsan, the ammunition is resistant against electromagnetic jamming.

See also 
35 mm Oerlikon GDF

Comparable systems 
K30 Biho
M247 Sergeant York
Marksman anti-aircraft system
PZA Loara
Tunguska-M1
Type 95 SPAAA
Type 87 self-propelled anti-aircraft gun
ZSU-23-4 Shilka

References

35 mm artillery
Armoured fighting vehicles of Turkey
Self-propelled anti-aircraft weapons
Post–Cold War weapons of Turkey
Military vehicles introduced in the 2010s
Aselsan products